Marvin Santiago (December 26, 1947 – October 6, 2004) was a Puerto Rican salsa singer who became famous all across Latin America during the 1970s. He was also a part-time comedian on Puerto Rican television.

Early life 

Santiago was born in the Santurce district of San Juan, Puerto Rico. In his younger years Santiago lived between the Bólivar and Sánchez streets in the Parada 22 area of Santurce. At the age of 13, Santiago and his family moved to the Nemesio Canales public housing project where he was eventually nicknamed "El Grifo de Canales" ("The kinky-haired of Canales") by close friends and fans. Santiago was diagnosed with type 1 diabetes at a young age.

During his youth, Santiago would participate in jam sessions in his neighborhood as well as in school. His first professional job as a singer was in 1966 with Roberto Valdés group "Los Trotamundos".

Recording career

Rafael Cortijo 

Upon a recommendation from conga player Celso Clemente, famed Puerto Rican composer Tite Curet Alonso met Santiago and brought him to an audition for Rafael Cortijo's group. Santiago was hired to sing with Cortijo's group and in three weeks time learned the bands repertoire and started touring with them throughout Dominican Republic, New York City and Chicago. On an impulse, Santiago decided to stay in Chicago. During breaks from Cortijo's group, Santiago played with local bands "Gilberto Y Su Sexteto" & "La Sonora De Felipe Rodríguez".

Santiago's first recorded tracks appeared on Rafael Cortijo Y Su Bonche's album "Ahí Na Má! Put It There", released in 1968. Two of the tracks recorded where Santiago provided lead vocals, "Vasos En Colores" and "La Campana Del Lechón", were later recorded by Santiago as a solo artist. Santiago provided background vocals on other tracks from the album.

Roberto Angleró 

In 1969 Santiago left Chicago and returned to Puerto Rico where he joined Johnny "El Bravo" López's group and toured with them briefly. On one engagement with López in Coamo, Puerto Rico, Santiago met Roberto Angleró and offered his services as a backup singer if he ever needed one. Soon after that meeting, Angleró needed a background singer and called López to see if he could lend Santiago to do some background vocals for his group and López told Angleró "you can keep him if you want to". Santiago joined Angleró's group and in 1970 recorded an album with them. The album had a minor hit with the track "Chán Con Chán". The track "Salao" from the album was later recorded as "Safa Diablo" by Bobby Valentín's group with Santiago on lead vocals. Another track from the album, "El Pantalón", was later recorded as "El Filo Del Pantalón" by Santiago as a solo artist.

Bobby Valentín 

Late in 1970 Bobby Valentín, another type 1 diabetic, hired Santiago as the lead singer of his band after Frankie Hernández left his group. Valentin was one of the original members of the Fania All-Stars, an exclusive Salsa conglomerate of Fania Records musicians that showcased other performers such as Celia Cruz, Rubén Blades, Hector Lavoe, Roberto Roena and many others. Santiago would become an impromptu member of the group, and later a member in his own right.

Santiago's first recording with Valentin's group was the album "Rompecabezas", released in 1971. The songs "Amolador", "Beso Borracho", "Papel De Payaso" & "Vete Pa' llá" were big hits from that album.

Santiago's second recording with Valentin's group was the album "Soy Boricua", released in 1972. Many considered the album a classic and the title track, written by Roberto Angleró, an informal patriotic anthem for Puerto Ricans. The album's title song, and the Curet Alonso written "Pirata De La Mar", became major international hits.

Santiago was part of the band when Valentín played a concert at the Río Piedras State Penitentiary. The concert was recorded and released as two separate albums in 1975."Préstame Tu Caballo & "Dos Soneros" were the most popular tracks performed by Santiago on the recording.

On Valentín's 1976 album, "Afuera", Santiago had a few hits. Among them "Son Son Chararí" (Written by Angleró) and "El Jíbaro Y La Naturaleza". The latter a nostalgia/protest song with environmental overtones, which featured Fania All-Stars member Barry Rogers in a trombone solo. Valentín was forced to drop Santiago off his band due to Santiago's drug addiction at the time.

Puerto Rico All Stars 

Late in 1976, Santiago provided background vocals and was the lead singer for the track "Los Tambores" on Puerto Rico All Stars self-titled first album. Puerto Rico All Stars featured Puerto Rican musicians exclusively and was a rival to NY based Fania All-Stars.

Solo Artist 

In 1977 Santiago recorded and released his first solo album "De Los Soneros". Tito Valentín and Wito Morales produced the album. The recording had the hits "Al Revés" & "De Los Soneros".

After that album, Santiago joined Tommy Olivencia's group for about a year and recorded tracks destined to appear on Olivencia's album "Sweat Trumpet Hot "Salsa"". During the recording sessions Olivencia found out that Santiago was still under contract with his previous label and had Simón Pérez re–record Santiago's vocals. Three tracks from those sessions with Santiago's vocals, "Que Dichoso Es", "La Pela" & "Del Montón", later appeared on Santiago's compilation "15 Éxitos De Marvin Santiago" released by TH Records in 1984.

Famous arranger and producer Jorge Millet knew Santiago well and their friendship could be traced back to the late 1960s when they met while both lived in the city of Chicago. Millet was aware of Santiago's potential and as a friend wanted to lend him a helping hand by giving him the opportunity to record as a solo artist. As producer and talent scout for TH Records, Millet was able to provide the arrangements, musicians and artwork for Santiago's debut album with the label. The album, "Fuego A La Jicotea", was released in 1979. The album was very successful and considered a classic for many music fans. The album's title track, written by  Cortijo, was a major hit in Puerto Rico and Venezuela. The song was a thinly-veiled ode to marijuana. Santiago's remake of a song from his days in Cortijo, "Vasos En Colores", was also a major hit from the album and remained in his live repertoire throughout his career. Other hits from the album were   "La Picúa", a veiled homage to the female anatomy, and "El Mangoneo" (a Mozambique very much in the style of Cortijo's "Sorongo").

Santiago's follow-up album, "Caliente Y Explosivo", released in 1980, was another success. It also had Millet as arranger, piano player and musical director. Millet also designed the cover art for this album. The album contained the hits "Al Son De La Lata Baila El Chorizo" (Originally played by Ismael Rivera when he was part of Cortijo Y Su Combo), "El Tiburón De Agua Dulce" (Written by Millet and the longest studio track Santiago ever recorded at just over seven minutes with an amazing piano solo by Millet), "La Buruquena De Doña Inés" & "Esta Noche Sale El Lobo".

Many of the songs in Santiago's solo albums were fast-paced, full of intensity and laden with humor and double entendres. Santiago was a master improviser that used "soneos" (rhyming verses common to Salsa music) with a strong sense of alliteration, consonance and rhythm that was described once by Rubén Blades this way: "(Rhythm-wise) Marvin is capable of fitting a Mack truck into a parking space where a Volkswagen Beetle won't fit." He also used strong Puerto Rican figures of speech and slang that eventually granted him the moniker of "El Sonero del Pueblo".

Drug Arrest And Sentence 

In 1980, at the height of his popularity, Santiago was arrested and imprisoned for cocaine possession. He served in prison a little over five out of the ten years he was sentenced due to good behavior. Ruben Blades visited Santiago while in prison something for which Santiago was eternally grateful to Blades.

Shortly after he entered prison, Santiago became a born-again Christian and stopped using drugs. As part of his rehabilitation program, Santiago became the director of a group of prisoners that dedicated their efforts towards drug prevention awareness programs (Confinados En Acción Y Prevención). Santiago went to universities and public schools to give talks about drug prevention.

In July 1981 Millet died from a massive heart attack. Santiago was allowed a prison pass to attend the funeral home where Millet's body rested and pay respects to his friend.

In late 1981, Santiago released the album "Adentro" ("Inside"). The title of the album referred to the fact that Santiago was in prison. The album was recorded live at the Bayamón regional jail and the vocals were later overdubbed in a makeshift studio at the jail. A minor hit from the album was "Auditorio Azul" (Based on the fact that prison uniforms at that facility were blue in color).

In 1982, Santiago was invited and participated on the Third Penitentiary Theater Festival held in Venezuela.

Santiago recorded three more studio albums while serving his sentence. The albums were not received as well as previous albums due to a combination of factors. Among those factors were; arrangements that were not at the same level as the ones provided by Millet produced albums, Santiago's spiritual reawakening and the considerably cleaned up lyrics on his later work, something that his hardcore fans did not approve of, and the surge of merengue groups such as the Puerto Rico-based Conjunto Quisqueya and Freddie Kenton Orchestra, as well as new local talent such as Eddie Santiago, Gilberto Santa Rosa, and Frankie Ruiz who popularized the so-called "Romantic Salsa", which eventually displaced more urban-based subject matter in Salsa songs.

Later life 

Santiago played several shows outside prison while he served his sentence. Santiago earned over $100,000 from those presentations. By the time he left prison, the bank account holding the earnings of his presentations while in prison had about $2,500 left. Shortly after Santiago found out, he divorced his wife.

Even though Santiago's fame waned a bit by the time he finished his prison sentence, he was able to keep a busy schedule by touring in Puerto Rico and other Latin American countries.

Santiago also appeared on Puerto Rican TV several times, often as a comedian in Luisito Vigoreaux's produced TV shows.

Santiago rejoined Valentín in 1991 to record new versions of old songs he did with Valentín for a CD commemorating Valentín's 25th anniversary in the music business. Santiago also participated on a concert celebrating Valentín's 25th anniversary, later released on DVD.

Santiago last studio album with Valentín, "Donde Lo Dejamos", was released in 1992. By this release it was noticeable that Santiago's voice was starting to fade and becoming hoarse and raspy due to poor vocal coaching.

In 1999, the House of Representatives of Puerto Rico had a tribute at the Capitol Building to honor Santiago's musical career.

In 2000, Santiago participated on the theater play "El Hospitalillo" at the Carmen Delia Dipiní Theater gathering critical acclaim. 
	
In August 2000, Santiago participated in Tommy Olivencia's 40th anniversary celebration as a bandleader at the Tito Puente amphitheater, in San Juan, P.R. The concert was recorded and released on CD the following year.

In July 2001, a few of his musical colleagues organized a tribute concert to Santiago. The concert was held at the Tito Puente amphitheater and some of the performers sharing the stage with Santiago were Vitín Avilés, Carlos "Cano" Estremera, Meñique, Guillo Rivera & Luigi Texidor

In 2002 Santiago joined the all-star roster of singers and musicians that took part of Bobby Valentin's 35th anniversary live concert held at the Río Piedras State Penitentiary. Among the all-star lineup were Rubén Blades, Cheo Feliciano, Pedro Guzmán, Giovanni Hidalgo, Papo Lucca, Roberto Roena & Luigi Texidor. The concert was filmed and released on DVD.

For a few years until early 2003, Santiago shared a popular radio program every Saturday night with JC "El Babalao" Cordero. The program, "Salsa Gorda", featured Salsa music from the 1970s and 1980s.

In March 2004 a tribute concert was held at the Tito Puente amphitheater, in San Juan, P.R. by several musicians to celebrate Santiago's musical career. Among the performers were Luisito Carrión, Oscar D'León, Elías Lopes, Andy Montañez, Luis "Perico" Ortíz & Domingo Quiñones. The concert was filmed and released on CD and DVD.

In May 2004 Santiago was part of the singers and musical colleagues that participated on a tribute concert dedicated to the 45th anniversary of Tommy Olivencia musical career.

Santiago, who adopted Marvin Hagler's "Marvelous" nickname (both because of their common first name and the fact that, at one time, his head was shaved bald like Hagler's), had begun conversations to join a Fania All-Stars comeback as a tribute to Celia Cruz by the summer of 2004, but then, he became severely ill.

Death 

Santiago's diabetes started taking a toll on his health during the 1990s. In October 1996 Santiago had his right leg amputated after having three toes amputated in three separate occasions a few months earlier. He also started having problems with his sight. In November 2002 Santiago suffered two heart attacks followed by a major kidney failure in February 2003. After the kidney failure incident, Santiago had to undergo dialysis treatment. Santiago's name was placed on a waiting list for a kidney transplant but was not able to get a donor. Santiago lost vision from one eye and suffered severe kidney, heart and liver damage on the weeks prior to his death. On the afternoon of October 6, 2004 after many years of health issues, Santiago died at the age of 56 at the San Pablo Hospital in Bayamón, Puerto Rico. His funeral was well attended by the public and music friends, with his brother Billyván playing a Plena tribute to Marvin.

Legacy 

In the Villa Palmeras neighborhood in Santurce, there is a square named "Plaza De Los Salseros" honoring the memory of distinguished Salsa music luminaries. In December 2009, a bust (Sculpture) of Santiago and a plaque were added to honor his music legacy. His daughter, Roseann Santiago traveled from Chicago to attend the reveal of his sculpture. Other artists honored in the square are Rafael Cortijo, Héctor Lavoe, Tommy Olivencia, Tito Puente, Ismael Rivera and Pellín Rodríguez.

Santiago left a legacy of songs still heard and popular phrases still in current use in Puerto Rico. One phrase was an affirmation: "¡O-fi-cial!". Another was a stream of references to Puerto Rican towns: "¡Baya-móntate, Barran-quítate, Vega Bájate, Ad-júntate!", roughly translated to "get on, get out of the way, get down, get together!", mentioned along the names of Bayamón, Barranquitas, Vega Baja and Adjuntas. A third one was: "¡Linda Melodía!" (Beautiful Melody!), which he uttered when a musical arrangement was particularly complex or remarkable.

He also used code phrases to refer to drugs: "¡Guayacol, con uña rallá!" was his code phrase for cocaine, and "¡Acetileno!" his reference for heroin. After his religious conversion, however, Marvin affirmed that the only substance in his life from that moment on, besides the insulin he needed daily for his diabetes, was "Cristomicina", a portmanteau of the name of Christ and erythromycin.

Discography

Singles

LP's

Compilations

Videos

See also

List of Puerto Ricans

References

1947 births
2004 deaths
People from Santurce, Puerto Rico
Singers from San Juan, Puerto Rico
Deaths from diabetes
20th-century Puerto Rican male singers
Salsa musicians